Sergeyev is a 16-hands chestnut  thoroughbred stallion who won the Royal Ascot Jersey Stakes in 1995.

References

1992 racehorse births
Racehorses bred in Ireland
Racehorses trained in the United Kingdom
Thoroughbred family 1-w